Feijoal may refer to:

Feijoal, Amazonas, a village in the state of Amazonas, Brazil
Feijoal, Fogo, a village on the island Fogo, Cape Verde